Sphaeralcea coccinea, the scarlet globemallow, is a perennial plant growing 10–30 cm tall from spreading rhizomes with a low habit. They have grayish stems with dense, star-shaped hairs and alternately arranged leaves. The leaf blades are 2–5 cm long, palmately shaped, and deeply cut, with 3–5 main wedge-shaped segments. The undersides of the leaves have gray hairs.  The 2-cm-wide flowers are reddish-orange and saucer-shaped, with 5 notched, broad petals, in small terminal clusters. Plants flower from May to October.

This species is native to grasslands and prairies of the Great Plains and western regions of northern North America. While on the course of his expedition, near the Marias River, Meriwether Lewis collected a specimen of this species.

References

External links

coccinea
Flora of the Northwestern United States
Flora of the North-Central United States
Flora of the United States
Flora of the South-Central United States
Flora of the Southwestern United States
Flora of Western Canada
Flora of the Great Plains (North America)
Flora without expected TNC conservation status